Kerstin Bohman (9 November 1914 – 3 January 2005) was a Swedish gymnast. She competed in the women's artistic team all-around event at the 1948 Summer Olympics.

References

External links
 

1914 births
2005 deaths
Swedish female artistic gymnasts
Olympic gymnasts of Sweden
Gymnasts at the 1948 Summer Olympics
People from Hudiksvall Municipality
Sportspeople from Gävleborg County
20th-century Swedish women